The first season of the Brazilian competitive reality television series MasterChef Junior premiered on October 20, 2015, at 10:30 p.m. on Band.

The grand prize was R$20.000, a trip for six to Disney World courtesy of Decolar.com, a 3-month cooking course with the three judges, a year's supply on Carrefour of R$1,000 per month, one small appliance kitchen package by Oster and the MasterChef Junior trophy.

Lorenzo Ravioli won the competition over Lívia Lopes on December 15, 2015.

Contestants

Top 20

Elimination table

Key

Ratings and reception

Brazilian ratings
All numbers are in points and provided by IBOPE.

 

Note: Episode 5 aired against the Brazil vs. Peru football match for the 2018 FIFA World Cup qualification.
Note: Episode 8 aired against the season finale of A Fazenda 8.

References

External links
 MasterChef Junior on Band.com
 

2015 Brazilian television seasons
MasterChef Junior 1